Jade  is a village in Karnataka, located  away from Sirsi

References

Villages in Shimoga district